The Royal Victorian Order is an order of knighthood awarded by the sovereign of the United Kingdom and several Commonwealth realms. It is granted personally by the monarch and recognises personal service to the monarchy, the Royal Household, royal family members, and the organisation of important royal events. The order was officially created and instituted on 23 April 1896 by letters patent under the Great Seal of the Realm by Queen Victoria. It was instituted with five grades, the two highest of which were Knight Grand Cross (GCVO) and Knight Commander (KCVO), which conferred the status of knighthood on holders (apart from foreigners, who typically received honorary awards not entitling them to the style of a knight). Women were not admitted until Edward VIII altered the statutes of the order in 1936; those receiving the highest two awards were styled dames and those grades, when conferred on women, are Dame Grand Cross and Dame Commander (DCVO).

No limit was placed on the number of appointments which could be made. King George VI appointed 43 Knights Grand Cross and 12 Dames Grand Cross between his accession to the throne on 11 December 1936 and his death on 6 February 1952.

Knights and Dames Grand Cross appointed by George VI

The list below is ordered by date of appointment. Full names, styles, ranks and titles are given where applicable, as correct at the time of appointment to the order. Branch of service or regiment details are given in parentheses to distinguish them from offices. The offices listed are those given in the official notice, printed in the London Gazette. Where applicable, the occasion is given that was listed either with the notices or in published material elsewhere, in which case that material is cited.

Source: Galloway et al., 1996, p. 112

References

Notes

Citations

Bibliography 
 P. Duckers (2004), British Orders and Decorations (Princes Risborough: Shire Publications Ltd)
 P. Galloway, D. Stanley, D. Martin (1996), Royal Service, volume 1 (London: Victorian Publishing)
 C. McCreery (2008), On Her Majesty's Service: Royal Honours and Recognition in Canada (Toronto: Dundurn Press)
 W. M. Shaw (1906), The Knights of England, volume i (London: Sherratt and Hughes; OCLC 185192520)

British honours system
Royal Victorian Order
Royal Victorian